Judith Seidman (born September 1, 1950) is a Canadian medical researcher and politician. She was named to the Senate of Canada as a Conservative on August 27, 2009.

Seidman was the Quebec co-chair of Stephen Harper's 2004 leadership campaign.

She is an epidemiologist and social worker by profession as well as a researcher and adviser in the health and social services fields.

Seidman is Jewish.

References

External links
 

Canadian senators from Quebec
Conservative Party of Canada senators
Women members of the Senate of Canada
Women in Quebec politics
Living people
1950 births
McGill University people
21st-century Canadian politicians
21st-century Canadian women politicians
Jewish Canadian politicians
Jewish women politicians